The 2022 Arizona Diamondbacks season was the franchise's 25th season in Major League Baseball and their 25th season at Chase Field in Phoenix, Arizona as members of the National League West Division. They were managed by Torey Lovullo in his sixth season with the franchise.

On December 2, 2021, Commissioner of Baseball Rob Manfred announced a lockout of players, following expiration of the collective bargaining agreement (CBA) between the league and the Major League Baseball Players Association (MLBPA). On March 10, 2022, the MLB and MLBPA agreed to a new collective bargaining agreement, thus ending the lockout. Opening Day was played on April 7. Although MLB previously announced that several series would be cancelled due to the lockout, the agreement provides for a 162-game season, with originally canceled games to be made up via doubleheaders.

The team finished fourth in the NL West with a 74-88 record and missed the postseason.

Offseason

Lockout 

The expiration of the league's collective bargaining agreement (CBA) with the Major League Baseball Players Association occurred on December 1, 2021, with no new agreement in place. As a result, the team owners voted unanimously to lockout the players stopping all free agency and trades.

The parties came to an agreement on a new CBA on March 10, 2022.

Rule changes 
Pursuant to the new CBA, several new rules were instituted for the 2022 season. The National League will adopt the designated hitter full-time, a draft lottery will be implemented, the postseason will expand from ten teams to twelve, and advertising patches will appear on player uniforms and helmets for the first time.

Roster

Season standings

National League West

National League Wild Card

Regular season

Game log

|- style="background:#bfb;" 
| 1 || April 7 || Padres || 4–2 || Mantiply (1–0) || Suárez (0–1) || — || Chase Field || 35,508 || 1–0 || W1
|- style="background:#fbb;" 
| 2 || April 8 || Padres || 0–3 || Manaea (1–0) || Pérez (0–1) || Rogers (1) || Chase Field || 17,297 || 1–1 || L1
|- style="background:#fbb;"
| 3 || April 9 || Padres || 2–5 || Wilson (1–0) || Kennedy (0–1) || Rogers (2) || Chase Field || 19,504 || 1–2 || L2
|- style="background:#fbb;"
| 4 || April 10 || Padres || 5–10 || Adams (1–0) || Smith (0–1) || — || Chase Field || 19,089 || 1–3 || L3
|- style="background:#fbb;"
| 5 || April 12 || Astros || 1–2 || Neris (1–0) || Melancon (0–1) || Pressly (3) || Chase Field || 17,674 || 1–4 || L4
|- style="background:#bfb;"
| 6 || April 13 || Astros || 3–2  || Pérez (1–1) || Pressly (0–1) || — || Chase Field || 12,660 || 2–4 || W1
|- style="background:#fbb;" 
| 7 || April 15 || @ Mets || 3–10 || Bassitt (2–0) || Davies (0–1) || —  || Citi Field || 43,820 || 2–5 || L1
|- style="background:#bfb;" 
| 8 || April 16 || @ Mets || 3–2 || Poppen (1–0) || Rodríguez (0–1) || Melancon (1) || Citi Field || 37,935 || 3–5 || W1
|- style="background:#fbb;" 
| 9 || April 17 || @ Mets || 0–5 || Shreve (1–0) || Ramirez (0–1) || — || Citi Field || 24,515 || 3–6 || L1
|- style="background:#bbb;" 
| — || April 18 || @ Nationals || colspan=8 | Postponed (rain); Makeup April 19
|- style="background:#fbb;" 
| 10 || April 19  || @ Nationals || 1–6 || Gray (2–1) || Bumgarner (0–1) || — || Nationals Park || 9,261 || 3–7 || L2
|- style="background:#fbb;" 
| 11 || April 19  || @ Nationals || 0–1 || Adon (1–2) || Gilbert (0–1) || Rainey (3) || Nationals Park || 11,720 || 3–8 || L3
|- style="background:#bfb;" 
| 12 || April 20 || @ Nationals || 11–2 || Kelly (1–0) || Fedde (1–1) || — || Nationals Park || 15,774 || 4–8 || W1
|- style="background:#bfb;" 
| 13 || April 21 || @ Nationals || 4–3 || Davies (1–1) || Rogers (1–2) || Melancon (2) || Nationals Park || 14,424 || 5–8 || W2
|- style="background:#fbb;" 
| 14 || April 22 || Mets || 5–6  || Díaz (1–0) || Melancon (0–2) || Lugo (1) || Chase Field || 20,939 || 5–9 || L1
|- style="background:#bfb;" 
| 15 || April 23 || Mets || 5–2 || Castellanos (1–0) || Williams (0–1) || Mantiply (1) || Chase Field || 25,413 || 6–9 || W1
|- style="background:#fbb;" 
| 16 || April 24 || Mets || 2–6 || Megill (3–0) || Wendelken (0–1) || — || Chase Field || 23,570 || 6–10 || L1
|- style="background:#fbb;" 
| 17 || April 25 || Dodgers || 0–4 || Buehler (2–1) || Kelly (1–1) || — || Chase Field || 17,750 || 6–11 || L2
|- style="background:#bfb;" 
| 18 || April 26 || Dodgers || 5–3 || Kennedy (1–1) || Graterol (0–1) || Melancon (3) || Chase Field || 18,063 || 7–11 || W1
|- style="background:#bfb;" 
| 19 || April 27 || Dodgers || 3–1 || Kennedy (2–1) || Hudson (1–1) || Melancon (4) || Chase Field || 15,138 || 8–11 || W2
|- style="background:#fbb;" 
| 20 || April 28 || @ Cardinals || 3–8 || Hudson (2–1) || Castellanos (1–1) || — || Busch Stadium || 33,464 || 8–12 || L1
|- style="background:#bfb;" 
| 21 || April 29 || @ Cardinals || 6–2 || Bumgarner (1–1) || Wainwright (2–3) || — || Busch Stadium || 40,753 || 9–12 || W1
|- style="background:#bfb;" 
| 22 || April 30 || @ Cardinals || 2–0 || Kelly (2–1) || Mikolas (1–1) || Kennedy (1) || Busch Stadium || 40,144 || 10–12 || W2
|-

|- style="background:#fbb;" 
| 23 || May 1 || @ Cardinals || 5–7 || Whitley (2–0) || Middleton (0–1) || Helsley (1) || Busch Stadium || 45,123 || 10–13 || L1
|- style="background:#bfb;" 
| 24 || May 2 || @ Marlins || 5–4 || Gallen (1–0) || López (3–1) || Kennedy (2) || LoanDepot Park || 6,224 || 11–13 || W1
|- style="background:#bfb;" 
| 25 || May 3 || @ Marlins || 5–4 || Castellanos (2–1) || Rogers (1–4) || Mantiply (2) || LoanDepot Park || 6,263 || 12–13 || W2
|- style="background:#bfb;" 
| 26 || May 4 || @ Marlins || 8–7 || Middleton (1–1) || Bender (0–3) || Kennedy (3) || LoanDepot Park || 7,356 || 13–13 || W3
|- style="background:#bfb;" 
| 27 || May 6 || Rockies || 4–1 || Kelly (3–1) || Estévez (1–1) || Melancon (5) || Chase Field || 18,551 || 14–13 || W4
|- style="background:#fbb;"
| 28 || May 7 || Rockies || 1–4 || Colomé (1–0) || Melancon (0–3) || Bard (9) || Chase Field || 24,133 || 14–14 || L1
|- style="background:#bfb;" 
| 29 || May 8 || Rockies || 4–0 || Gallen (2–0) || Márquez (0–3) || — || Chase Field || 19,323 || 15–14 || W1
|- style="background:#bfb;" 
| 30 || May 9 || Marlins || 4–3 || K. Nelson (1–0) || Hernández (2–2) || Melancon (6) || Chase Field || 11,571 || 16–14 || W2
|- style="background:#bfb;" 
| 31 || May 10 || Marlins || 9–3 || Bumgarner (2–1) || Luzardo (2–3) || — || Chase Field || 8,855 || 17–14 || W3
|- style="background:#fbb;" 
| 32 || May 11 || Marlins || 3–11 || Bass (1–1) || Melancon (0–4) || — || Chase Field || 9,058 || 17–15 || L1
|- style="background:#bfb;"
| 33 || May 13 || Cubs || 4–3 || Davies (2–1) || Smyly (1–4) || Melancon (7) || Chase Field || 21,765 || 18–15 || W1
|- style="background:#fbb;" 
| 34 || May 14 || Cubs || 2–4 || Givens (3–0) || Melancon (0–5) || Wick (3) || Chase Field || 25,169 || 18–16 || L1
|- style="background:#fbb;"
| 35 || May 15 || Cubs || 2–3 || Effross (1–1) || Kennedy (2–2) || Wick (4) || Chase Field || 23,309 || 18–17 || L2
|- style="background:#fbb;" 
| 36 || May 16 || @ Dodgers || 4–5 || Gonsolin (4–0) || Bumgarner (2–2) || Kimbrel (6) || Dodger Stadium || 42,650 || 18–18 || L3
|- style="background:#fbb;" 
| 37 || May 17  || @ Dodgers || 6–7 || Bruihl (1–1) || Gilbert (0–2) || Kimbrel (7) || Dodger Stadium || 42,089 || 18–19 || L4
|- style="background:#fbb;"
| 38 || May 17  || @ Dodgers || 3–12 || Anderson (4–0) || Kelly (3–2) || — || Dodger Stadium || 46,850 || 18–20 || L5
|- style="background:#fbb;" 
| 39 || May 18 || @ Dodgers || 3–5 || Buehler (5–1) || Davies (2–2) || Hudson (2) || Dodger Stadium || 35,643 || 18–21 || L6
|- style="background:#bfb;"
| 40 || May 19 || @ Cubs || 3–1 || Gallen (3–0) || Stroman (1–4) || Melancon (8) || Wrigley Field || 32,631 || 19–21 || W1
|- style="background:#bfb;" 
| 41 || May 20 || @ Cubs || 10–6 || Castellanos (3–1) || Hendricks (2–4) || — || Wrigley Field || 31,235 || 20–21 || W2
|- style="background:#bfb;" 
| 42 || May 21 || @ Cubs || 7–6  || Kennedy (3–2) || Wick (1–1) || Melancon (9) || Wrigley Field || 32,269 || 21–21 || W3
|- style="background:#fbb;" 
| 43 || May 22 || @ Cubs || 4–5 || Thompson (4–0) || Kennedy (3–3) || — || Wrigley Field || 32,606 || 21–22 || L1
|- style="background:#bfb;" 
| 44 || May 23 || Royals || 9–5 || Wendelken (1–1) || Greinke (0–3) || — || Chase Field || 14,629 || 22–22 || W1
|- style="background:#bfb;" 
| 45 || May 24 || Royals || 8–6 || Mantiply (2–0) ||  Clarke (1–1) || Melancon (10) || Chase Field || 12,616 || 23–22 || W2
|- style="background:#fbb;"  
| 46 || May 26 || Dodgers || 1–14 || Bruihl (1–1) || Castellanos (3–2) || — || Chase Field || 17,057 || 23–23 || L1
|- style="background:#fbb;" 
| 47 || May 27 || Dodgers || 4–6 || Graterol (1–2) || Bumgarner (2–3) || — || Chase Field || 24,865 || 23–24 || L2
|- style="background:#fbb;" 
| 48 || May 28 || Dodgers || 2–3 || Gonsolin (5–0) || Kelly (3–3) || Hudson (3) || Chase Field || 30,819 || 23–25 || L3
|- style="background:#fbb;"
| 49 || May 29 || Dodgers || 1–3 || Anderson (6–0) || Davies (2–3) || Kimbrel (10) || Chase Field || 30,482 || 23–26 || L4
|- style="background:#bfb;" 
| 50 || May 30 || Braves || 6–2 || Gallen (4–0) || Strider (1–2) || — || Chase Field || 20,735 || 24–26 || W1
|- style="background:#bfb;" 
| 51 || May 31 || Braves || 8–7  || Melancon (1–5) || Stephens (1–2) || — || Chase Field || 12,686 || 25–26 || W2
|-

|- style="background:#fbb;" 
| 52 || June 1 || Braves || 0–6 || Wright (5–3) || Bumgarner (2–4) || — || Chase Field || 12,370 || 25–27 || L1
|- style="background:#bfb;"
| 53 || June 3 || @ Pirates || 8–6 || Kelly (4–3) || Brubaker (0–5) || Melancon (11) || PNC Park || 16,444 || 26–27 || W1
|- style="background:#fbb;" 
| 54 || June 4 || @ Pirates || 1–2 || Stratton (3–2) || Melancon (1–6) || — || PNC Park || 19,149 || 26–28 || L1
|- style="background:#fbb;" 
| 55 || June 5 || @ Pirates || 0–3 || Thompson (3–4) || Gallen (4–1) || Bednar (10) || PNC Park || 11,796 || 26–29 || L2
|- style="background:#fbb;" 
| 56 || June 6 || @ Reds || 0–7  || Greene (3–7) || Bumgarner (2–5) || — || Great American Ball Park || 9,485 || 26–30 || L3
|- style="background:#fbb;" 
| 57 || June 7 || @ Reds || 8–14 || Ashcraft (3–0) || Gilbert (0–3) || — || Great American Ball Park || 11,512 || 26–31 || L4
|- style="background:#bfb;"
| 58 || June 8 || @ Reds || 7–0 || Kelly (5–3) || Minor (0–2) || — || Great American Ball Park || 11,957 || 27–31 || W1
|- style="background:#bfb;"
| 59 || June 9 || @ Reds || 5–4 || Melancon (2–6) || Santillan (0–1) || Kennedy (4) || Great American Ball Park || 13,167 || 28–31 || W2
|- style="background:#fbb;"
| 60 || June 10 || @ Phillies || 5–7 || Gibson (4–2) || Gallen (4–2) || Knebel (11) || Citizens Bank Park || 37,423 || 28–32 || L1
|- style="background:#fbb;" 
| 61 || June 11 || @ Phillies || 0–4 || Wheeler (5–3) || Bumgarner (2–6) || — || Citizens Bank Park || 30,820 || 28–33 || L2
|- style="background:#bfb;"
| 62 || June 12 || @ Phillies || 13–1 || Weaver (1–0) || Suárez (4–4) || — || Citizens Bank Park || 41,218 || 29–33 || W1
|- style="background:#fbb;"
| 63 || June 13 || Reds || 4–5 || Minor (1–2) || Kelly (5–4) || Strickland (2) || Chase Field || 13,735 || 29–34 || L1
|- style="background:#fbb;"
| 64 || June 14 || Reds || 3–5  || Cessa (3–1) || Poppen (1–1) || Kuhnel (1) || Chase Field || 15,081 || 29–35 || L2
|- style="background:#bfb;" 
| 65 || June 15 || Reds || 7–4 || Ramirez (2–1) || Warren (2–3) || — || Chase Field || 14,917 || 30–35 || W1
|- style="background:#bfb;" 
| 66 || June 17 || Twins || 7–2 || Bumgarner (3–6) || Smeltzer (3–1) || — || Chase Field || 26,351 || 31–35 || W2
|- style="background:#fbb;" 
| 67 || June 18 || Twins || 1–11 || Bundy (4–3) || Weaver (1–1) || — || Chase Field || 24,338 || 31–36 || L1
|- style="background:#bfb;"  
| 68 || June 19 || Twins || 7–1 || Kelly (6–4) || Archer (1–3) || — || Chase Field || 30,690 || 32–36 || W1
|- style="background:#fbb;" 
| 69 || June 20 || @ Padres || 1–4 || Darvish (7–3) || Davies (2–4) || Rogers (21) || Petco Park || 35,430 || 32–37 || L1
|- style="background:#fbb;" 
| 70 || June 21 || @ Padres || 2–3  || Hill (2–0) || Kennedy (3–4) || — || Petco Park || 31,528 || 32–38 || L2
|- style="background:#fbb;" 
| 71 || June 22 || @ Padres || 4–10 || Morejón (1–0) || Bumgarner (3–7) || Martinez (1) || Petco Park || 31,024 || 32–39 || L3
|- style="background:#fbb;" 
| 72 || June 24 || Tigers || 1–5 || García (2–2) || Kelly (6–5) || — || Chase Field || 22,064 || 32–40 || L4
|- style="background:#fbb;"
| 73 || June 25 || Tigers || 3–6 || Alexander (1–3) || Mantiply (1–1) || Soto (14) || Chase Field || 23,129 || 32–41 || L5
|- style="background:#bfb;"
| 74 || June 26 || Tigers || 11–7 || Wendelken (2–1) || Vest (1–2) || — || Chase Field || 22,529 || 33–41 || W1
|- style="background:#bfb;"
| 75 || June 28 || Padres || 7–6 || Melancon (3–6) || Rogers (0–4) || — || Chase Field || 19,904 || 34–41 || W2
|- style="background:#fbb;"
| 76 || June 29 || Padres || 0–4 || Clevinger (2–0) || Bumgarner (3–8) || Martinez (2) || Chase Field || 20,109 || 34–42 || L1
|-

|- style="background:#bfb;"
| 77 || July 1 || @ Rockies || 9–3 || Kelly (7–5) || Senzatela (3–5) || — || Coors Field || 47,588 || 35–42 || W1
|- style="background:#fbb;" 
| 78 || July 2 || @ Rockies || 7–11 || Gomber (4–7) || Keuchel (2–6) || — || Coors Field || 48,331 || 35–43 || L1
|- style="background:#fbb;" 
| 79 || July 3 || @ Rockies || 5–6 || Bird (1–0) || Ramirez (2–2) || Bard (16) || Coors Field || 33,479 || 35–44 || L2
|- style="background:#bfb;" 
| 80 || July 4 || Giants || 8–3 || Bumgarner (4–8) || Rodón (7–5) || — || Chase Field || 27,752 || 36–44 || W1
|- style="background:#bfb;" 
| 81 || July 5 || Giants || 6–2 || Smith (1–1) || Leone (3–1) || — || Chase Field || 14,467 || 37–44 || W2
|- style="background:#fbb;" 
| 82 || July 6 || Giants || 5–7 || Brebbia (4–1) || Mantiply (1–2) || Long (1) || Chase Field || 13,445 || 37–45 || L1
|- style="background:#fbb;"
| 83 || July 7 || Rockies || 3–4 || Estévez (2–4) || Melancon (3–7) || Bard (17) || Chase Field || 11,727 || 37–46 || L2
|- style="background:#fbb;"
| 84 || July 8 || Rockies || 5–6 || Kuhl (6–5) || Poppen (1–2) || Colomé (4) || Chase Field || 15,524 || 37–47 || L3
|- style="background:#bfb;"
| 85 || July 9 || Rockies || 9–2 || Bumgarner (5–8) || Freeland (4–7) || — || Chase Field || 21,819 || 38–47 || W1
|- style="background:#fbb;" 
| 86 || July 10 || Rockies || 2–3 || Márquez (5–7) || Middleton (1–2) || Bard (18) || Chase Field || 18,126 || 38–48 || L1
|- style="background:#bfb;"
| 87 || July 11 || @ Giants || 4–3 || Kelly (8–5) || Cobb (3–4) || Melancon (12) || Oracle Park || 25,325 || 39–48 || W1
|- style="background:#fbb;"
| 88 || July 12 || @ Giants || 0–13 || Webb (8–3) || Keuchel (2–7) || — || Oracle Park || 23,353 || 39–49 || L1
|- style="background:#fbb;" 
| 89 || July 13 || @ Giants || 3–4 || Doval (3–4) || Melancon (3–8) || — || Oracle Park || 27,055 || 39–50 || L2
|- style="background:#fbb;"
| 90 || July 15 || @ Padres || 3–5 || Darvish (8–4) || Bumgarner (5–9) || Rogers (25) || Petco Park || 41,302 || 39–51 || L3
|- style="background:#fbb;"
| 91 || July 16 || @ Padres || 3–4 || Manaea (5–4) || Ramirez (2–3) || Rogers (26) || Petco Park || 42,384 || 39–52 || L4
|- style="background:#bfb;" 
| 92 || July 17 || @ Padres || 3–1 || Kelly (9–5) || Clevinger (2–3) || Melancon (13) || Petco Park || 36,428 || 40–52 || W1
|- style="background:#bbcaff 
| – || July 19 || colspan="9" | 92nd All-Star Game in Los Angeles, CA
|- style="background:#bfb;"
| 93 || July 22 || Nationals || 10–1 || Gallen (5–2) || Corbin (4–13) || — || Chase Field || 17,819 || 41–52 || W2
|- style="background:#bfb;"
| 94 || July 23 || Nationals || 7–2 || Bumgarner (6–9) || Sánchez (0–2) || — || Chase Field || 37,802 || 42–52 || W3
|- style="background:#fbb;" 
| 95 || July 24 || Nationals || 3–4 || Edwards Jr. (3–3) || Mantiply (1–3) || Finnegan (2) || Chase Field || 20,278 || 42–53 || L1
|- style="background:#bfb;" 
| 96 || July 25 || Giants || 7–0 || Kelly (10–5) || Junis (4–2) || — || Chase Field || 16,100 || 43–53 || W1
|- style="background:#bfb;"
| 97 || July 26 || Giants || 7–3 || Kennedy (4–4) || Rodón (8–6) || — || Chase Field || 16,989 || 44–53 || W2
|- style="background:#bfb;"
| 98 || July 27 || Giants || 5–3 || Ramirez (3–3) || Webb (9–4) || Melancon (14) || Chase Field || 17,043 || 45–53 || W3
|- style="background:#fbb;" 
| 99 || July 29 || @ Braves || 2–5 || Wright (13–4) || Bumgarner (6–10) || Jansen (24) || Truist Park || 41,536 || 45–54 || L1
|- style="background:#fbb;"
| 100 || July 30 || @ Braves || 2–6 || Anderson (9–6) || Martin (0–1) || — || Truist Park || 41,682 || 45–55 || L2
|- style="background:#fbb;" 
| 101 || July 31 || @ Braves || 0–1 || Jansen (5–0) || Melancon (3–9) || — || Truist Park || 39,005 || 45–56 || L3
|-

|- style="background:#fbb;" 
| 102 || August 1 || @ Guardians || 5–6  || Hentges (3–2) || Melancon (3–10) || — || Progressive Field || 13,707 || 45–57 || L4
|- style="background:#bfb;" 
| 103 || August 2 || @ Guardians || 6–3 || Gallen (6–2) || McKenzie (7–8) || Kennedy (5) || Progressive Field || 14,471 || 46–57 || W1
|- style="background:#fbb;" 
| 104 || August 3 || @ Guardians || 4–7 || Bieber (6–6) || Henry (0–1) || — || Progressive Field || 18,642 || 46–58 || L1
|- style="background:#bfb;"
| 105 || August 5 || Rockies || 6–5 || Devenski (1–0) || Colomé (2–5) || Kennedy (6) || Chase Field || 17,720 || 47–58 || W1
|- style="background:#fbb;"
| 106 || August 6 || Rockies || 2–3 || Estévez (3–4) || Kennedy (4–5) || Bard (23) || Chase Field || 21,146 || 47–59 || L1
|- style="background:#bfb;"
| 107 || August 7 || Rockies || 6–4 || Devenski (2–0) || Colomé (2–6) || Melancon (15) || Chase Field || 20,644 || 48–59 || W1
|- style="background:#bfb;" 
| 108 || August 8 || Pirates || 3–0 || Gallen (7–2) || Bañuelos (0–1) || Kennedy (7) || Chase Field || 11,275 || 49–59 || W2
|- style="background:#bfb;"
| 109 || August 9 || Pirates || 6–4 || Henry (1–1) || Thompson (3–9) || Melancon (16) || Chase Field || 12,901 || 50–59 || W3
|- style="background:#fbb;"
| 110 || August 10 || Pirates || 4–6 || Keller (4–8) || Bumgarner (6–11) || Stout (1) || Chase Field || 12,714 || 50–60 || L1
|- style="background:#bfb;" 
| 111 || August 11 || Pirates || 9–3 || Ginkel (1–0) || De Jong (4–1) || — || Chase Field || 12,725 || 51–60 || W1
|- style="background:#fbb;"
| 112 || August 12 || @ Rockies || 3–5 || Lamet (1–1) || Devenski (2–1) || Estévez (2) || Coors Field || 32,055 || 51–61 || L1
|- style="background:#bfb;"
| 113 || August 13 || @ Rockies || 6–0 || Gallen (8–2) || Ureña (1–4) || — || Coors Field || 35,233 || 52–61 || W1
|- style="background:#bfb;"
| 114 || August 14 || @ Rockies || 7–4 || Henry (2–1) || Feltner (2–4) || Kennedy (8) || Coors Field || 32,442 || 53–61 || W2
|- style="background:#fbb;"
| 115 || August 15 || @ Giants || 1–6 || Cobb (4–6) || Bumgarner (6–12) || — || Oracle Park || 20,694 || 53–62 || L1
|- style="background:#fbb;"
| 116 || August 16 || @ Giants || 1–2 || Brebbia (6–1) || Kennedy (4–8) || — || Oracle Park || 20,897 || 53–63 || L2
|- style="background:#bfb;"
| 117 || August 17 || @ Giants || 3–2 || Ramirez (4–3) || Leone (3–4) || Melancon (17) || Oracle Park || 22,649 || 54–63 || W1
|- style="background:#bfb;"
| 118 || August 18 || @ Giants || 5–0 || Gallen (9–2) || Webb (11–6) || — || Oracle Park || 26,197 || 55–63 || W2
|- style="background:#fbb;"
| 119 || August 19 || Cardinals || 1–5 || Mikolas (10–9) || Henry (2–2) || — || Chase Field || 32,183 || 55–64 || L1
|- style="background:#fbb;"
| 120 || August 20 || Cardinals || 7–16 || Cabrera (4–2) || Bumgarner (6–13) || — || Chase Field || 34,248 || 55–65 || L2
|- style="background:#fbb;"
| 121 || August 21 || Cardinals || 4–6 || Woodford (2–0) || Mantiply (1–4) || Gallegos (12) || Chase Field || 25,064 || 55–66 || L3
|- style="background:#bfb;"
| 122 || August 23 || @ Royals || 7–3 || Mantiply (2–4) || Staumont (3–3) || — || Kauffman Stadium || 12,427 || 56–66 || W1
|- style="background:#fbb;"
| 123 || August 24 || @ Royals || 3–5 || Singer (7–4) || Ramirez (4–4) || — || Kauffman Stadium || 10,531 || 56–67 || L1
|- style="background:#bfb;"
| 124 || August 26 || @ White Sox || 7–2 || Henry (3–2) || Cueto (6–6) || — || Guaranteed Rate Field || 33,054 || 57–67 || W1
|- style="background:#bfb;"
| 125 || August 27 || @ White Sox || 10–5 || Kelly (11–5) || Martin (2–4) || — || Guaranteed Rate Field || 25,837 || 58–67 || W2
|- style="background:#bfb;"
| 126 || August 28 || @ White Sox || 3–2 || Ramirez (5–4) || Graveman (3–3) || Kennedy (9) || Guaranteed Rate Field || 29,781 || 59–67 || W3
|- style="background:#bfb;"
| 127 || August 29 || Phillies || 13–7 || Frías (1–0) || Sánchez (2–2)|| — || Chase Field || 18,594 || 60–67 || W4
|- style="background:#bfb;"
| 128 || August 30 || Phillies || 12–3 || Gallen (10–2) || Nola (9–11) || — || Chase Field || 16,873 || 61–67 || W5
|- style="background:#fbb;"
| 129 || August 31 || Phillies || 2–18 || Falter (3–3) || Henry (3–3) || — || Chase Field || 13,690 || 61–68 || L1
|-

|- style="background:#bfb;"
| 130 || September 1 || Brewers || 5–0 || Kelly (12–5) || Woodruff (9–4) || — || Chase Field || 10,495 || 62–68 || W1
|- style="background:#bfb;"
| 131 || September 2 || Brewers || 2–1 || K. Nelson (2–0) || Lauer (10–6) || Kennedy (10) || Chase Field || 13,488 || 63–68 || W2
|- style="background:#fbb;" 
| 132 || September 3 || Brewers || 6–8  || Williams (6–3) || Mantiply (2–5) || Rogers (30) || Chase Field || 22,138 || 63–69 || L1
|- style="background:#bfb;"
| 133 || September 4 || Brewers || 5–1 || Gallen (11–2) || Alexander (2–2) || — || Chase Field || 20,274 || 64–69 || W1
|- style="background:#bfb;"
| 134 || September 5 || @ Padres || 5–0 || R. Nelson (1–0) || Snell (6–8) || — || Petco Park || 37,713 || 65–69 || W2
|- style="background:#fbb;"
| 135 || September 6 || @ Padres || 5–6 || Martinez (4–3) || Kennedy (4–7) || — || Petco Park || 31,308 || 65–70 || L1
|- style="background:#fbb;"
| 136 || September 7 || @ Padres || 3–6 || Darvish (13–7) || Henry (3–4) || Hader (31) || Petco Park || 36,948 || 65–71 || L2
|- style="background:#fbb;"
| 137 || September 9 || @ Rockies || 10–13 || Bard (5–4) || Smith (1–2) || — || Coors Field || 34,848 || 65–72 || L3
|- style="background:#fbb;"
| 138 || September 10 || @ Rockies || 1–4 || Lawrence (3–1) || Bumgarner (6–14) || Bard (29) || Coors Field || 27,871 || 65–73 || L4
|- style="background:#bfb;"
| 139 || September 11 || @ Rockies || 12–6 || Gallen (12–2) || Feltner (2–8) || — || Coors Field || 27,546 || 66–73 || W1
|- style="background:#fbb;" 
| 140 || September 12 || Dodgers || 0–6 || Anderson (15–3) || K. Nelson (2–1) || — || Chase Field || 19,393 || 66–74 || L1
|- style="background:#fbb;" 
| 141 || September 13 || Dodgers || 0–4 || Kershaw (8–3) || Kelly (12–6) || — || Chase Field || 21,143 || 66–75 || L2
|- style="background:#bfb;"
| 142 || September 14 || Dodgers || 5–3  || Moronta (1–0) || Kimbrel (4–6) || — || Chase Field || 22,971 || 67–75 || W1
|- style="background:#bfb;"
| 143 || September 15 || Padres || 4–0 || Jameson (1–0) || Manaea (7–9) || — || Chase Field || 17,121 || 68–75 || W2
|- style="background:#fbb;" 
| 144 || September 16 || Padres || 3–12 || Snell (7–9) || Bumgarner (6–15) || — || Chase Field || 19,945 || 68–76 || L1
|- style="background:#fbb;"
| 145 || September 17 || Padres || 0–2 || Musgrove (10–7) || Gallen (12–3) || Hader (33) || Chase Field || 29,796 || 68–77 || L2
|- style="background:#fbb;"
| 146 || September 18 || Padres || 1–6 || Darvish (15–7) || R. Nelson (1–1) || — || Chase Field || 20,480 || 68–78 || L3
|- style="background:#fbb;" 
| 147 || September 19 || @ Dodgers || 2–5 || Kershaw (9–3) || Kelly (12–7) || — || Dodger Stadium || 44,854 || 68–79 || L4
|- style="background:#fbb;"
| 148 || September 20  || @ Dodgers || 5–6 || Pepiot (3–0) || Ginkel (1–1) || Martin (2) || Dodger Stadium || 38,902 || 68–80 || L5
|- style="background:#bfb;"
| 149 || September 20  || @ Dodgers || 5–2 || Jameson (2–0) || Anderson (15–4) || Moronta (1) || Dodger Stadium || 43,097 || 69–80 || W1
|- style="background:#bfb;" 
| 150 || September 21 || @ Dodgers || 6–1 || Bumgarner (7–15) || May (2–3) || — || Dodger Stadium || 38,845 || 70–80 || W2
|- style="background:#fbb;"
| 151 || September 22 || @ Dodgers || 2–3 || Kimbrel (6–6) || Moronta (1–1) || — || Dodger Stadium || 47,907 || 70–81 || L1
|- style="background:#fbb;"
| 152 || September 23 || Giants || 5–6 || Young (1–1) || Smith (1–3) || Doval (25) || Chase Field || 25,949 || 70–82 || L2
|- style="background:#bfb;" 
| 153 || September 24 || Giants || 5–2 || Kelly (13–7) || Cobb (6–7) || Moronta (2) || Chase Field || 24,504 || 71–82 || W1
|- style="background:#fbb;"
| 154 || September 25 || Giants || 2–3 || Junis (5–6) || Frías (1–1) || Doval (26) || Chase Field || 25,389 || 71–83 || L1
|- style="background:#fbb;" 
| 155 || September 27 || @ Astros || 2–10 || García (14–8) || Davies (2–5) || — || Minute Maid Park || 37,480 || 71–84 || L2
|- style="background:#bfb;" 
| 156 || September 28 || @ Astros || 5–2  || Moronta (2–1) || Smith (0–3) || Melancon (18) || Minute Maid Park || 35,670 || 72–84 || W1
|- style="background:#fbb;" 
| 157 || September 30 || @ Giants || 4–10 || Cobb (7–7) || Kelly (13–8) || — || Oracle Park || 28,478 || 72–85 || L1
|-

|- style="background:#bfb;" 
| 158 || October 1 || @ Giants || 8–4 || Jameson (3–0) || Junis (5–7) || — || Oracle Park || 30,630 || 73–85 || W1
|- style="background:#fbb;" 
| 159 || October 2 || @ Giants || 3–4  || Cotton (4–2) || Widener (0–1) || — || Oracle Park || 34,824 || 73–86 || L1
|- style="background:#fbb;" 
| 160 || October 3 || @ Brewers || 5–6  || Boxberger (4–3) || Moronta (2–2) || — || American Family Field || 18,612 || 73–87 || L2
|- style="background:#fbb;" 
| 161 || October 4 || @ Brewers || 0–3 || Lauer (11–7) || Gallen (12–4) || Strzelecki (1) || American Family Field || 19,611 || 73–88 || L3
|- style="background:#bfb;"
| 162 || October 5 || @ Brewers || 4–2 || Poppen (2–2) || Gott (3–4) || Ginkel (1) || American Family Field || 18,765 || 74–88 || W1
|-

|-
| Legend:       = Win       = Loss       = PostponementBold = Diamondbacks team member

Opening day

Statistics

Batting 
(through October 5, 2022)
Players in bold are on the active roster.
Note: G = Games played; AB = At bats; R = Runs; H = Hits; 2B = Doubles; 3B = Triples; HR = Home runs; RBI = Runs batted in; SB = Stolen bases; BB = Walks; K = Strikeouts; AVG = Batting average; OBP = On-base percentage; SLG = Slugging percentage; TB = Total bases

Source

Pitching 
(through October 5, 2022)
Players in bold are on the active roster.
Note: W = Wins; L = Losses; ERA = Earned run average; WHIP = Walks plus hits per inning pitched; G = Games pitched; GS = Games started; SV = Saves; IP = Innings pitched; H = Hits allowed; R = Runs allowed; ER = Earned runs allowed; BB = Walks allowed; K = Strikeouts

Source

Minor league affiliations

References

External links
Arizona Diamondbacks 2022 schedule at MLB.com
2022 Arizona Diamondbacks season at Baseball Reference

Arizona Diamondbacks
Arizona Diamondbacks
Arizona Diamondbacks seasons